Valladolid may refer to:

In Spain:
Valladolid, a historical city in the autonomous community of Castile-León.
Valladolid Province, a province of Castile and León, Spain.
Real Valladolid, a football club based in Valladolid.

In Ecuador:
 Valladolid Parish

In Honduras:
Valladolid, Lempira.

In Mexico:
Valladolid, Yucatán
Valladolid Municipality, Yucatan
Morelia, Michoacán, known as Valladolid between 1578 and 1828.

In the Philippines: 
Valladolid, Negros Occidental.

Other:
Valladolid debate, a 16th-century theological debate concerning the souls of the natives of the so-called New World.
Marcela Valladolid, celebrity chef